The University of Houston is a Carnegie Tier One state research university in Houston, Texas.

The University of Houston may also refer to:

University of Houston System of college campuses 
Campuses in the University of Houston System:
 University of Houston
 University of Houston–Downtown
 University of Houston–Victoria
 University of Houston–Clear Lake

Academic campuses 
 University of Houston Law Center
 University of Houston College of Liberal Arts and Social Sciences
 University of Houston–Downtown College of Sciences and Technology
 University of Houston College of the Arts
 University of Houston College of Medicine

See also 
 Houston Cougars, collegiate varsity sports program of the University of Houston main campus
 University of Houston Charter School, charter school in Houston affiliated with the University of Houston